Faycal Bousbiat (born 13 July 1970) is a Canadian judoka. He formerly represented Algeria.

He is now a coach.

Achievements

See also
Judo in Canada

References

External links

1970 births
Living people
Algerian emigrants to Canada
Immigrants to Quebec
Algerian male judoka
Canadian male judoka
Mediterranean Games bronze medalists for Algeria
Mediterranean Games medalists in judo
Competitors at the 1993 Mediterranean Games
African Games medalists in judo
Competitors at the 1991 All-Africa Games
African Games silver medalists for Algeria